The Fun Makers is the debut album by the Israeli rock band, Izabo, released in .

Track listing

Personnel
 Ran Shem Tov: lead guitar, lead vocals
 Jonathan Levy: bass
 Shiri Hadar: keyboards
 Nir Mantzur: drums

2003 albums